Isa Abdul-Quddus (born August 3, 1989) is a former American football safety. He was signed by the New Orleans Saints as an undrafted free agent in 2011 and has also played for the Detroit Lions and Miami Dolphins. He played college football for Fordham University.

Professional career

New Orleans Saints
Abdul-Quddus was signed by the New Orleans Saints as an undrafted rookie free agent following the 2011 NFL Draft. On January 7, 2014, Abdul-Quddus was released by the Saints.

Detroit Lions
Abdul-Quddus was claimed off waivers by the Detroit Lions on February 3, 2014. On March 10, 2015, the Lions re-signed Abdul-Quddus to a one-year contract.

Miami Dolphins
On March 9, 2016, the Miami Dolphins signed Abdul-Quddus to a three-year contract totaling $12.75 million. He started 15 games in his first season with the Dolphins. He recorded a career-high 78 tackles along with five passes defended, two interceptions, and one sack. He was placed on injured reserve on December 28, 2016, after suffering a neck injury in Week 16 against the Buffalo Bills.

On March 9, 2017, Abdul-Quddus was released by the Dolphins.

References

External links
Miami Dolphins bio
Detroit Lions bio
New Orleans Saints bio
Fordham Rams bio

1989 births
Living people
African-American Muslims
Players of American football from Newark, New Jersey
American football safeties
Fordham Rams football players
New Orleans Saints players
Detroit Lions players
Miami Dolphins players
Union High School (New Jersey) alumni